Camelot is an electoral ward of South Somerset District Council in Somerset, England. It is one of the wards that makes up the parliamentary constituency of Somerton and Frome.

A rural ward, the A303 road passes through; it contains the villages of Marston Magna, Rimpton, Sparkford, Queen Camel, West Camel and Weston Bampfylde.

The ward is represented by one councillor, currently this is Michael Lewis, a member of the Conservative Party who was re-elected in the district elections of 2015, with 68% of the vote.

References

Wards of South Somerset